Lara M. Schwartz is a music video director.

Music videography

As producer and/or executive producer
Aaliyah “Hot Like Fire”
Aaliyah “The One I Gave My Heart To”
Anthony Hamilton "Nobody Else"
BOB Clique "Hostage"
Boogie Monsters "Beginning of the End"
Bo-Shed “Come On In”
Bounty Killer “Deadly Zone”
Boyz II Men "On Bended Knee"
Branford Marsalis "No Pain, No Gain"
Craig Mack "Making Moves With Puff"
Craig Mack "Get Down"
Da Brat & Jermaine DuPri "Funkdafied"
Damage "Anything"
Da Ruffness "1 N 1"
Day Ta Day "U Represent"
DeVante "Gin and Juice"
Doug E. Fresh & Little Vicious "Freaks"
Doug E. Fresh "It's Ii-ght"
Dub War "Strike It"
Faith; "You Used To Love Me"
Front Line Assembly; "Millennium"
Funkdoobiest "XXX Funk"
Harry Connick Jr. “Let’s Just Kiss”
Hoez With Attitude (HWA) EPK
Jaz B. Lat'n "Set It Off"
Johnny Marrs "Hubba Bubba Baby"
Junior Mafia "Player's Anthem"*
(*Nominated for Best New Artist Clip; 1995 Billboard Music Video Awards)
Junior M.A.F.I.A. "Get Money"
Junior M.A.F.I.A. "I Need You Tonight"
Kali Ranks "Kill Dem All"
K-Ci & JoJo “All My Life”**
(**Nominated for Best R&B Video; 1998 MTV Music Video Awards)
Kedar Mgmt. "At The Apollo"
Keith Sweat "When I Give My Love"
Keesha “You Got Me Where You Want”
Kenny Lattimore & Heather Headley “Love Will Find A Way”
Kino "Game Recognize Game"
Lil' Kim "Crush On You"
Lil' Kim "My Time To Shine"
Lil' Kim (featuring Da Brat, Left Eye, Missy Elliott, & Angie Martinez)"Ladies Night"
Little Vicious "The Glock"
Lost Boyz “What’s Wrong...”
Mary J. Blige "Be Happy”
Messiah "I Feel Love"
Mic Geronimo “Wherever You Are”
Michael Jackson "History II" Home Video Titles
Napalm Death "A Plague Rages”
NKRU "Computer Love"
Nonchalant "5 O'Clock"
Nonchalant “Take It There”
Notorious B.I.G. "Juicy"
Notorious B.I.G. "One More Chance"***
(***Nominated for Best Rap Video; 1995 Billboard Music Video Awards)
NTC "Try My Love"
112 "Only You"
Once Blue "Save Me"
Outta Control "Sinful Wishes"
Ricardo da Force "Why"
Ryan Reynolds "Do I Ever Cross You’re Mind”
Sable "For Old Times Sake"
Salt-n-Pepa "Champagne"
Section 8 "No Love"
Sister Machine Gun "Hole In The Ground" and "Burn"
Sway “When Suzanna Cries”
Tom Jones “Sex Bomb”
Total "Can't You See"
Total "Can't You See" Re-mix
12 Gauge "Dunkie Butt"
Vesta “Somebody For Me”
Whitney Houston "I Believe In You & Me"

As director
Elevator Suite “Backaround”
Smokey Robinson “Sleepin’ In”
Keesha “You Got Me Where You Want”
Kenny Lattimore & Heather Headley “Love Will Find A Way”
Nonchalant “Take It There”
K-Ci & JoJo “All My Life”*
(*Nominated for Best R&B Video; 1998 MTV Music Video Awards)
Vesta “Somebody For Me”
Peter Andre “Kiss The Girl”
Amari “Callin’”
Bounty Killer “Deadly Zone”
Lost Boyz “What’s Wrong With The Way I Live”
Teddy Pendergrass "Give It To Me"
Tasha Holiday "Just The Way You Like It"
Tracey Lee "The Theme"
Sybil "Still A Thrill"
Day Ta Day "Smile"
No Coast “City Streets”

As production manager
YZ "The Ghetto's Been Good To Me"
Maestro & Showbiz "Fine Tune Da Mic"
Dirt Nation "Khadejah"

As camera operator
Al Jarreau & Kathleen Battle; TV spot
Deborah Harry Interview
Michael Speaks Performance

Other works

Traditional commercials
ABC Daytime Promo
Faith Evans Promo
Mary J. Blige WTLC Radio Advertisement

As production manager
Hyundai Car Advertisement
Stouffer's Advertisement
Donna Karan (DKNY) Advertisement
Kobecker Co. Shoe Advertisement
Gap Advertisement

Live broadcasts
Women in Hollywood Television Awards Show
Democratic National Convention 2004
Greg Godek Satellite Broadcast
Money Magazine Satellite Broadcast
Eckerd Corporation Satellite Broadcast

Documentaries
Salt N’Pepa EPK/Documentary I
Salt N’ Pepa EPK/Documentary II
Ahakhav Tribal Preserve Youth Cultural Festival

Short films
Brand New
Le Bateau Indiscret
The Fear Mechanic
Repeater

Feature films

As production manager
Girls Town - won the Filmmakers Trophy Award at the 1996 Sundance Film Festival & earned a Special Recognition for the Screenplay

DVD Production

As executive producer
Quills - Short Documentary and Director Commentary Production

References

http://www.randomhouse.com/author/results.pperl?authorid=100145
https://www.amazon.com/s?ie=UTF8&search-type=ss&index=books&field-author=Lara%20M.%20Schwartz&page=1

Living people
Music video directors
Place of birth missing (living people)
Year of birth missing (living people)